The Washington State Legislature is the state legislature of the U.S. state of Washington. It is a bicameral body, composed of the lower Washington House of Representatives, composed of 98 Representatives, and the upper Washington State Senate, with 49 Senators plus the Lieutenant Governor acting as president. The state is divided into 49 legislative districts, each of which elect one senator and two representatives.

The State Legislature meets in the Legislative Building at the Washington State Capitol in Olympia.

As of January 2023, Democrats control both houses of the Washington State Legislature. Democrats hold a 58-40 majority in the House of Representatives and a 29-20 majority in the Senate.

History
The Washington State Legislature traces its ancestry to the creation of the Washington Territory in 1853, following successful arguments from settlers north of the Columbia River to the U.S. federal government to legally separate from the Oregon Territory. The Washington Territorial Assembly, as the newly created area's bicameral legislature, convened the following year. The legislature represented settlers from the Strait of Juan de Fuca to modern Montana.

The Female Voting Franchise
From nearly the start of the territory, arguments over giving women the right to vote dogged legislative proceedings. While some legislators carried genuine concerns over women deserving the right to vote, most legislators pragmatically believed that giving women suffrage would entice more Eastern women to immigrate to the remote and sparsely populated territory. In 1854, only six years after the Seneca Falls Convention, the issue was brought to a vote by the legislature. Women's suffrage was defeated in a tied vote of 9 to 9 (an absolute majority, or 10 votes, was needed to pass laws). This was due to one legislator voting against this bill because he had an American Indian wife and only white women would have been able to vote.

A decade later, the Wyoming Legislature would become the first body in the United States to grant women's suffrage in 1869.

The issue over female suffrage did not diminish. In 1871 Susan B. Anthony and Thurston County Representative Daniel Bigelow addressed the legislature on the issue.  In 1883, the issue returned to the floor, this time with the Territorial Assembly successfully passing universal suffrage for women. It quickly became one of the most liberal voting laws in the nation, giving female African-American voters the voting franchise for the first time in the United States. However, in 1887, the territorial Washington Supreme Court ruled the 1883 universal suffrage act as unconstitutional in Harland v. Washington. Another attempt by the legislature to regrant universal female suffrage was again overturned in 1888.

After two failed voter referendums in 1889 and 1897, activism led by Emma Smith DeVoe and May Arkwright Hutton, among others, led the state legislature to approve the state constitutional amendment granting full female voting rights, which Washington's (male) voters ratified in 1910 by a vote of 52,299 to 29,676.

Statehood
With more than two decades of pressure on federal authorities to authorize statehood, on February 22, 1889, the U.S. Congress passed the Enabling Act, signed into law by outgoing President Grover Cleveland, authorizing the territories of Washington, North Dakota, South Dakota, and Montana to form state governments. The Territorial Assembly set out to convene a constitutional convention to write a state constitution.

Following its successful passage by the legislature, Washington voters approved the new document on October 1. On November 11, 1889, President Benjamin Harrison authorized Washington to become the 42nd state of United States. It was the last West Coast state of the Continental U.S. to achieve statehood. The modern Washington State Legislature was created.

Meetings
The bicameral body is composed of legislators, beginning the legislative session annually on the second Monday in January. In odd-numbered years, when the state budget is debated upon, the State Legislature meets for 105 days, and in even-numbered years for 60 days. The Governor of Washington, if necessary, can call legislators in for a special session for a 30-day period at any time in the year. Legislators also can call themselves into special session by a two-thirds vote by both the House of Representatives and the State Senate.

Television coverage
Debates within both the House and Senate, as well as committee meetings and other special events within or relating to the legislature are broadcast throughout Washington on TVW, the state public affairs network.  Debates can also be found on the web at TVW.org.

Vacancies
Unlike some state legislatures, the Washington State Legislature does not hold special elections midyear if a seat becomes vacant between regular elections. Instead, the county council or board of county commissioners for the county or counties where the vacant district is located are given the responsibility of choosing the successor. The state central committee of the political party that last held the seat must submit a list of up to three candidates to the board, who must make the final selection within 60 days of the vacancy. A special election is then held alongside November general elections.

Compensation
As of July 2022, legislators receive an annual salary of $57,876. The Speaker of the House and Senate majority leader receive salaries of $66,016, while the House and Senate minority leaders receive salaries of $61,946. Per diem is set at 89% of the federal per diem rate and is $185 as of 2022.

See also
Washington State Capitol
Washington House of Representatives
Washington State Senate
 List of Washington state legislatures

Further reading

 Don Brazier, History of the Washington Legislature, 1854-1963. Olympia, WA: Washington State Senate, 2000.

References

External links
Washington State Legislature

 
Government of Washington (state)
Bicameral legislatures